"Daisuki da yo." (大好きだよ。, I love you.) is Ai Otsuka's sixth single, which was released on October 20, 2004 under the avex trax label. It peaked at number three on the Oricon chart in Japan.

"Daisuki da yo." is available as a CD or CD+DVD combination. First pressings of the CD only combination included a limited edition picture book illustrated by Otsuka while the CD+DVD combination included a DVD containing the Daisuki da yo PV. Daisuki da yo. has sold 156,844 units in total.

The song also appears on Otsuka's Love Jam album and was used as the theme song for the drama Tokio Chichi e no Dengon.

Track list

Music video
The music video features some captions at the beginning describing Ai's love for a man she misses. After this introduction, there is Ai talking into a camera as her 'boyfriend' joins her for her birthday. It is filmed as an 8-minute mini-drama. The storyline features a happier Ai through videos and pictures taken, a crying Ai holding her dead boyfriend's hand at a morgue/hospital, and then a melancholy Ai against a dark background. The video ends with a flashback of Ai and her boyfriend at night walking the streets.

An animated version of Daisuki da yo features Ai's bunny characters, LOVE and LOVE's male counterpart. It shows scenes of a melancholy LOVE in a pink room reminiscing the times dancing and going motorcycle riding with her lover.

References
avex network inc. (2006), Ai Otsuka Official Web Site

2004 singles
Ai Otsuka songs
Japanese television drama theme songs
2004 songs
Songs written by Ai Otsuka
Song recordings produced by Max Matsuura
Avex Trax singles